WJOU (90.1 FM, "Praise 90.1 FM") is a non-commercial, listener-supported college radio station licensed to Huntsville, Alabama, and owned and operated by Oakwood University. It serves the Oakwood University community and the Tennessee Valley area.

The station began back in the early/mid-1970s as a powerline-fed carrier current AM station operating as WOAK. The broadcast FM station had held the WOCG call letters since it was initially licensed by the Federal Communications Commission but on January 4, 2008, the callsign was changed to WJOU. This change was made to reflect the January 1, 2008 change of Oakwood College's name to Oakwood University.

Programming
WJOU plays a blend of Christian contemporary, urban contemporary gospel, and adult contemporary music that they call "Inspirational Soul". The station also airs brief educational and spiritually uplifting programs.

Notable alumni of this station include comedian Jonathan Slocumb, talk radio host and producer Hallerin Hilton Hill, broadcaster Toni Neal, plus FlavaTV host and disc jockey Skip Cheatham.

References

External links
 WJOU official website
 

JOU
JOU
Mainstream adult contemporary radio stations in the United States
Contemporary Christian radio stations in the United States
Gospel radio stations in the United States
Moody Radio affiliate stations
Radio stations established in 1979
1979 establishments in Alabama
Seventh-day Adventist media
JOU